Gothic is an upcoming remake of the 2001 computer game of the same name. The game is in development at Alkimia Interactive.

Background and production 
In May 2019, the Austrian computer game publisher THQ Nordic bought the German development studio Piranha Bytes, which was the author and the rights holder of the computer game Gothic. This title and ownership passed to THQ Nordic.

In December 2019, the Spanish branch of THQ Nordic, THQ Barcelona, released the game demo Gothic Playable Teaser and at the same time started a public survey to get feedback from the Gothic fan community on the demo and on the idea of a remake. The response to it was relatively high, with over 180,000 downloads of the demo and over 30,000 responses, which varied accordingly. In February 2020, THQ Nordic announced the production of the remake. According to the publisher, over 90% of the players were in favor for a production of a remake.

Before the start of production, in May 2020, Alkimia Interactive was founded in Barcelona specifically for the development of a Gothic remake. All creative people involved were advised to have played the original title before the start of production. Piranha Bytes itself had stated to THQ Nordic that its own motivation in game development was not another Gothic game, but the development of other titles such as ELEX.

By their own admission, the "heart" that Alkimia Interactive is focusing on in production is the AI. An algorithm in the game decides which animation sequences are called up or follow one another, so that the movements of the PC and NPCs appear realistic. The algorithm/the AI uses 20-30-minute motion capture recordings as specifications, which have been divided into individual sequences and categorized, which is referred to as motion magic. According to Alkimia Interactive Iteration has been given a lot of work-time during the production in this regard. "Controls and UI" are also "two big points" to make the game "more accessible [than the original]". According to Reinhard Pollice, the lead producer at Alkimia Interactive, the combat system in the remake is based on the original, in contrast to the playable teaser. Aside from certain graphics taken from the playable teaser, there was a "complete reboot" in game design after the community feedback on the demo called for a remake that was more close to the original than the demo itself. Accordingly, the skill system will again be "very close to the original". Lockpicking will feature a system similar to the original, but will be, according to Alkimia Interactive, presented differently. Due to increased design options and higher level of detail since 2001, the game world, which is based on the original, will be 10-15% larger overall. If some places in the original game world were not fully designed, an attempt was made to "take up such potential".  Therefore some locations show an increase of 25%. Through those few new locations the remake has got additional quests, which are based on the camp affiliation. Puzzles have been revised to include "new interactions". "Plotholes" of the original would be "better explained" in the remake. In 2023, at Alkimia Interactive, circa 45 people work on the production of the remake.

The THQ-studio Gate21, based in Sarajevo, was commissioned to design armor and NPCs. In contrast to the predecessor, the armor of the NPCs will not look exactly the same, but will differ in details, so that there will be variations from each armor model. In order to facilitate and speed up the work process, NPC faces are created using deep learning AI.

The game is developed with the Unreal Engine for organizational reasons. When asked in August 2022 whether there will be mod support for the remake, the development studio, which itself consists of employees who had worked on mods for Gothic I and Gothic II, could not provide any information.

Soundtrack and synchronisation 
Kai Rosenkranz, who was already the composer of the eponymous original, is (as of August 2022) also responsible for the soundtrack of the remake. Rosenkranz reinterprets the original soundtrack and adds additional pieces of music.

The game will be voiced in German and English and due to its large fanbases in Poland and Russia, in polish and Russian, too. When creating the German language edition, Alkimia Interactive wants to include voice actors who were involved in the original, whenever possible.

Marketing and release 
A first trailer was released in August 2022. Artworks of the remake have been published on Steam at regular intervals since January 2023 at the latest. In February 2023, Alkimia Interactive claimed the development was "in the middle of production and therefore perfectly on schedule", but did not want to commit to a release date. In March 2023, the studio cited the year 2024 as a "realistic release timeline."

External links 
 Official website

References 

Gothic (series)
Upcoming video games
Video game remakes
THQ Nordic games
Single-player video games
Windows games
PlayStation 5 games
Xbox Series X and Series S games
Unreal Engine games